Allerton Cushman Hickmott (February 4, 1895 – 1977) was an American book collector and writer. 

He graduated from Dartmouth College in 1917. 

He amassed a substantial collection of Shakespearian material he subsequently donated to Dartmouth.

He was appointed to the Savings Banks' Railroad Investment committee.

He received a doctor of letters from Trinity College in 1958.

He was a member of the Acorn Club, elected in 1963.

Works 
The Ivory Pale: The Shakespearean Collection of Allerton C. Hickmott

External links 
Dartmouth finding aid
Memorial at Find a Grave

References 

1895 births
1977 deaths
Dartmouth College alumni